5-MeO-DiBF is a psychedelic that has been sold online as a designer drug and was first definitively identified in December 2015 by a forensic laboratory in Slovenia. It is thought to act as an agonist for the 5-HT1A and 5-HT2 family of serotonin receptors. It is related in structure to the psychedelic tryptamine derivative 5-MeO-DiPT, but with the indole nitrogen replaced by oxygen, making 5-MeO-DiBF a benzofuran derivative. It is several times less potent as a serotonin agonist than 5-MeO-DiPT and with relatively more activity at 5-HT1A, but still shows strongest effects at the 5-HT2 family of receptors.
LEGAL STATUS.
It is not controlled under the 1971 Convention on Psychotropic Substances, so thus it has a legal grey area in many countries of the world, but its consumption still could be persecuted under severe analogue acts or the intend of sell to human consumption.

See also 
 Dimemebfe

References 

Benzofuranethanamines
Designer drugs
Serotonin receptor agonists
Psychedelic drugs
Diisopropylamino compounds
Benzofuran ethers at the benzene ring